Zawadka  is a village in the administrative district of Gmina Strzyżów, within Strzyżów County, Subcarpathian Voivodeship, in south-eastern Poland. Zawadka is the largest producer of barley in the county.

References

Villages in Strzyżów County